Menace to Sobriety is the debut studio album by American rap rock group OPM. It was released in August 2000 via Atlantic Records, and was re-released on September 8, 2015 as part of its 15-year anniversary. There is also a clean version of the album, which removes most of the profanities used on the explicit version and any drug references.

The album spawned three charted singles and music videos for: "Heaven Is a Halfpipe" (which also reached #68 in Triple J's Hottest 100 for the year 2000 in Australia), "El Capitan" and "Stash Up".

Track listing

B-sides
 "Space People" - 3:45 (from Heaven Is a Halfpipe CD single)
 "Group Therapy" - 2:20 (from Heaven Is a Halfpipe CD single)
 "El Capitan (SoulChild Remix)" - 3:37 (from El Capitan CD single)
 "Undercover Freak (007 Version)" (from El Capitan CD single)
 "Stash Up (Funk Food Remix)" (from Stash Up Maxi single)
 "Heaven Is A Halfpipe (Original Demo)" - 4:21 (from Stash Up Maxi single)

Personnel
OPM – producers (tracks: 1, 4, 6–8, 10, 12, 14), co-producers (track 9), art direction & design
Matthew Meschery – vocals (tracks: 1, 3-10, 12, 14), keyboards (tracks: 7, 8, 10), programming (tracks: 1, 8)
John Edney – vocals (tracks: 1, 3-10, 12, 14), cover, illustration
Geoff "Casper" Turney – guitar (tracks: 1, 3-10, 12, 14)
Ronald Keys Jr. – scratches (tracks: 4, 8, 14)
Additional musicians

James Kevin Dotson – vocals (tracks: 5–7, 12), bass (tracks: 1, 4, 6, 7, 12, 14), guitar (tracks: 1, 3, 5–7, 9, 12, 14), keyboards (track 14)
Angelo Moore – vocals (tracks: 7, 12), saxophone (track 12)
Asdru Sierra – vocals & horns (track 8)
Ulises Bella – vocals & horns (track 8)
Miguel Ángel Huidobro Preciado – vocals (track 8)
Brady Willmon – vocals (track 10), beatboxing (track 14)
Garry Hughes – keyboards & drum programming (tracks: 3, 5, 9), producer (track 15), co-producer (tracks: 3. 5. 9)

Nat Gleason – piano (track 3), keyboards (tracks: 4, 12)
Eric Avery – guitar (track 1)
Josh Deutsch – guitar (tracks: 3, 5), bass (track 3), drum programming (tracks: 3, 5, 9), producer (tracks: 3, 5, 9, 15)
Rusty Anderson – guitar (track 3)
David Rainger – guitar & bass (track 5)
David Mansfield – pedal steel guitar (track 9)
Sean E Demott – guitar (track 10), bass (tracks: 8, 10)
Melvin Gibbs – bass (tracks: 3, 9)
Leslie Van Trease – drums (tracks: 6, 7, 9, 12, 14)
Michael Patterson – drum programming (tracks: 3, 5), programming (tracks: 1, 4, 6, 10, 12), producer (tracks: 1, 2, 4, 6–8, 10-14), co-producer (track 5), engineering (tracks: 3, 5, 8, 9), mixing (tracks: 3, 4, 8, 9, 12), recording (tracks: 1, 4, 6–8, 12, 14)
Alan Friedman – drum programming (track 3)
Ryan Boesch – programming (tracks: 8, 10)
Mike Pandos – percussion (track 7)
Jiro Yamaguchi – percussion (track 8)
Daniel Deutsch – harmonica (track 5)
Dylan Ramos – beatboxing (track 14)
Paige Taite – beatboxing (track 14)
Malcolm Michiles – scratches (tracks: 3, 5, 15)
Craig Kallman – producer (tracks: 3, 5, 9)
Samuel Vaughan Merrick IV – engineering (tracks: 3, 5, 9)
Jeff Moleski – engineering (track 5), additional recording (tracks: 7, 12)
David Kahne – mixing (track 5)
Stephen Marcussen – mastering
Stewart Whitmore – digital editor
Thomas Bricker – art direction & design
Kristin J. Klosterman – photography
Sean Murphy – photography
Cindy Hartman – A&R coordinator
Kevin Williams – A&R

Chart history

References

External links

2000 debut albums
OPM (band) albums
Atlantic Records albums
Albums produced by Craig Kallman